Jonni Cabrera (born 14 June 1989) is a Paraguayan association footballer.

Career
In 2009, he represented Paraguay U20 at the 2009 South American U-20 Championship in Venezuela.

He was transferred from Cerro Porteño to the Youth Academy of Udinese on 24 July 2009.

He was issued the number #35 for the 2009–10 Serie A season and was present at the club at the same time as Alexis Sánchez however he did not manage to make a first-team appearance.

On 30 August 2010, he was loaned to Spain's Granada.

On 14 August 2011, he was loaned to Sportivo Luqueño.

He played for Deportivo Mandiyú in the Copa Argentina in 2012.

See also
 2009 South American Youth Championship squads
 List of transfers of the Primera División Paraguaya 2009
 List of Italian football transfers summer 2009 (July)
 List of Italian football transfers summer 2010 (August)
 List of Italian football transfers summer 2011 (August)
 2009–10 Udinese Calcio season

References

Paraguayan footballers
1989 births
Living people
Association football defenders